Ong Ewe Hock  (born 14 March 1972) is a former badminton player from Malaysia. He is the younger brother of Ong Ewe Chye.

Achievements

World Cup 
Men's singles

Asian Championships 
Men's singles

Asian Cup 
Men's singles

Southeast Asian Games 
Men's singles

Commonwealth Games 
Men's singles

Men's doubles

IBF World Grand Prix 
The World Badminton Grand Prix sanctioned by International Badminton Federation (IBF) since from 1983 to 2006.

Men's singles

Honours
  :
 Member of the Order of the Defender of the Realm (A.M.N.) (2000)

References

1972 births
Living people
People from Penang
Malaysian sportspeople of Chinese descent
Malaysian male badminton players
Badminton players at the 1996 Summer Olympics
Badminton players at the 2000 Summer Olympics
Olympic badminton players of Malaysia
Badminton players at the 1994 Asian Games
Badminton players at the 2002 Asian Games
Asian Games bronze medalists for Malaysia
Asian Games medalists in badminton
Medalists at the 1994 Asian Games
Medalists at the 2002 Asian Games
Badminton players at the 1994 Commonwealth Games
Badminton players at the 1998 Commonwealth Games
Commonwealth Games gold medallists for Malaysia
Commonwealth Games silver medallists for Malaysia
Commonwealth Games bronze medallists for Malaysia
Commonwealth Games medallists in badminton
Competitors at the 1995 Southeast Asian Games
Competitors at the 1997 Southeast Asian Games
Competitors at the 2001 Southeast Asian Games
Southeast Asian Games gold medalists for Malaysia
Southeast Asian Games silver medalists for Malaysia
Southeast Asian Games bronze medalists for Malaysia
Southeast Asian Games medalists in badminton
20th-century Malaysian people
Medallists at the 1994 Commonwealth Games
Medallists at the 1998 Commonwealth Games